Kumardad or Konardan is a town in Sistan va Baluchestan, Iran.

Nearby towns and villages include Hichan (2.8 nm), Shegim-e Pa'in (6.0 nm), Rujegan (3.9 nm), Surdan (3.6 nm), Bel Pir (5.6 nm), Jowz Dar (5.5 nm) and Sarhan (1.8 nm).

References

Populated places in Sistan and Baluchestan Province